Michelle Alexander is a bioarchaeologist with an interest in multi-faith societies and is Senior Lecturer in Bioarchaeology at the University of York.

Research 
Alexander specialises in the study of medieval diet through stable isotope analysis. She was part of the research team for the European Research Council funded project The Archaeology of Regime Change: Sicily in Transition, which explored the changes in population in medieval Sicily. She is part of the research team for the Urban Ecology Zanzibar project. She is project lead for the Faith in Food, Food in Faith Network funded by the Arts & Humanities Research Council. She is part of the research team for ArchSci2020, which explores new scientific techniques to understand the circumpolar world. She is Co-Investigator on Landscapes of (Re)Conquest, which seeks to understand relationships between people, castles and landscapes in medieval Iberia. Alexander has published or co-authored work on millet in diets in early medieval Italy, medieval diet in Leopoli-Cencelle, medieval diet in agrarian Apulia,

Additionally Alexander has worked within teams to apply her research across a range of species, including:

 Chicken evolution
 Changes in human exploitation of marine vertebrates, through the SeaChanges project
 The domestication of geese
 Meso-American turkeys
 Ancient pigs

As well as across time periods:

 Isotopic analysis of hair from post-medieval London
 Osteology of sixteenth century Italian workers
 The Roman Imperial population at Muracciola Torresina
 Neolithic milk consumption

Career 
In 2011, Alexander was appointed as a Research Fellow in the Department of Archaeology at Aberdeen University. In 2011, she returned to Durham University as a Visiting Research Fellow, as well as holding a post at Cornell University, USA in the Department of Ecology and Evolutionary Biology. In 2012, Alexander was appointed Lecturer in Bioarchaeology at the University of York, which was followed by a Senior Lectureship in 2018.

Education 
Alexander graduated with BSc (Hons) in Archaeology from Durham University in 2005. She studied for an MSc in Bioarchaeology supported by Manchester and Sheffield Universities in 2006. Alexander graduated with a PhD from Durham University in 2010, which was funded by a Durham Doctoral Fellowship. Her doctoral thesis was entitled: Exploring Diet and Society in Medieval Spain: New Approaches Using Stable Isotope Analysis.

References 

 

British archaeologists
British women archaeologists
Bioarchaeologists
Cornell University alumni
Academics of the University of York
Alumni of Durham University
Living people
Year of birth missing (living people)